This is a list of newspapers in New Mexico.This is a list of daily newspapers currently published in New Mexico. For weekly newspapers, see List of newspapers in New Mexico.

Newspapers of record 
The three newspapers of record for New Mexico are:

Regional papers 
 Alamogordo Daily News - Alamogordo
 Alamogordo Town News - Alamogordo
 Artesia Daily Press - Artesia
 Cannon Connection - Clovis
 Carlsbad Current-Argus - Carlsbad
 Casino Entertainer - Albuquerque
 Catron Courier - Pie Town
 Cibola County Beacon - Grants
 Cloudcroft Mountain Weekly - Cloudcroft
 El Defensor-Chieftain - Socorro
 Deming Headlight - Deming
 The Eastern New Mexico News - Clovis
 Enchanted Circle News - Northeast Taos County and Western Colfax County
 Farmington Daily Times - Farmington
 Four Corners Business Journal - Farmington
 Gallup Independent - Gallup
 Green Fire Times - Santa Fe
 Guadalupe County Communicator - Santa Rosa
 Health City Sun - Albuquerque
 El Hispano News Albuquerque - Albuquerque
 Hobbs News-Sun - Hobbs
 Journal North - Santa Fe edition of the Albuquerque Journal
 Las Cruces Bulletin - Las Cruces
 Las Vegas Optic - Las Vegas
 Lea County Tribune - Hobbs
 Los Alamos Monitor - Los Alamos
 Lovington Daily Leader - Lovington
 Mountain Mail - Socorro
 Mountain Times - Timbero
 Mountain View Telegraph - Moriarty
 New Mexico Business Weekly - Albuquerque
 New Mexico Jewish Link - Albuquerque
 Northern New Mexico Tribune - Chama
 Quay County Sun - Tucumcari
 Questa Del Rio News - Northern  Taos County
 Raton Range -  Raton
 Rio Grande Sun - Española
 Rio Rancho Observer - Rio Rancho
 Roswell Daily Record - Roswell
 Ruidoso News - Ruidoso
 San Juan Sun - Farmington
 Sangre de Christo Chronicle - Angel Fire
 Santa Fe Reporter - Santa Fe
 Santa Fe Times - Santa Fe
 Sierra County Sentinel - Truth or Consequences
 Silver City Daily Press - Silver City
 Silver City Sun-News - Silver City
 The Edgewood Independent - Edgewood
 The Paper - Albuquerque 
 The Taos News - Taos Union County Leader - Clayton
 Valencia County News-Bulletin - Belen
 Weekly Alibi - Albuquerque

See also

References

External links
 . (Survey of local news existence and ownership in 21st century)

New Mexico